On October 21, 2008, Showtime commissioned a fourth and fifth season of Dexter, each consisting of 12 episodes. The show's writers convened during February and March 2009 to brainstorm ideas for the fourth season, and filming was scheduled to begin in June 2009. On May 27, 2009, Showtime announced that John Lithgow would guest star in all 12 episodes as Miami's latest and deadliest serial killer, and Keith Carradine would return as Lundy. The fourth season premiered on September 27, 2009, and focused on Dexter attempting to find his way to balance his family life, the birth of his son, and his "extra-curricular" activities.

The season received critical acclaim before airing, including that from Michael Ausiello of Entertainment Weekly, who saw the fourth season as being "bloody promising". The season opener was leaked to the Internet ahead of schedule in late August 2009. The fourth season premiered in the UK on the FX channel on August 20, 2010.

Plot
Dexter has married Rita and settled down to domestic life with her two children and their new baby Harrison. Dexter continues to act on the urge to kill, but the strain of his double life affects both his job at Miami Metro Police and his home life. Rita becomes upset that Dexter appears to be lying to her, including keeping his old waterfront condo where he has stashed his blood drop trophies, and their marriage goes through troubling times.

As the police investigate a series of small-time crimes and killings in the so-called "Vacation Murders" with the help of investigative journalist Christine Hill, retired FBI Special Agent Frank Lundy returns to Miami; Debra initially worries he has come back to get closer to her, but he later reveals that he is following a case that the FBI refused to handle. The "Trinity Killer", believed to be an older Caucasian male, kills three people in the same city roughly once each year and in a specific sequence: one young woman killed in a bathtub, a mother killed by falling, and a father bludgeoned. The first two of this pattern have recently happened in Miami, and Lundy believes he knows when and where the last will be, but he is powerless to act on this. After rekindling their relationship, both Lundy and Debra are shot by an unknown assailant; Debra survives but Lundy's wounds are fatal, and the police initially assume that this was another random killing committed by the "Vacation Murderer".

Dexter learns of Lundy's analysis, steals his records, and uses his own skills to sneak into the building and catch sight of the Trinity Killer in the act of dispatching his third victim. Dexter follows the killer to his home, and is very surprised to learn that he is Arthur Mitchell: husband and father, deacon at a local church, and leader of the "Four Walls One Heart" homebuilding charity organization. Dexter continues to watch him and comes to admire his ability to balance his killings along with his family and work lives. Using the alias "Kyle Butler", Dexter joins Arthur's church, befriends him, and learns from him how to improve his own relationship with Rita and his family, giving over his condo to Debra while transferring his killing implements into a shed behind their house. Meanwhile, the Miami police learn that the Trinity Killer places a small amount of cremation ashes at each murder scene, and identify that Trinity and the ash share similar genetics but otherwise cannot match Trinity to any criminal records.

Arthur takes Dexter on a weekend trip to Tampa, taking him to the house in which he grew up. This is where he, at age ten, saw his older sister die after he inadvertently surprised her in the bathroom; she fell through the glass shower door and severed her femoral artery, killing her almost immediately. This drove his mother to suicide and his father to be abusive, eventually forcing Arthur to kill him. Arthur's trauma is analogous to the event that transformed Dexter and his brother into killers. Dexter later stops Arthur from trying to commit suicide. Dexter discovers that the Trinity series represents the deaths of Arthur's sister, mother and father, and that Arthur has likely been using the Four Walls One Heart program to cover his tracks. Dexter discovers that Arthur's home life is not as pleasant as it appeared, as Arthur abuses his son and locks his daughter in her bedroom, and when things get violent at Thanksgiving dinner, Dexter is forced to subdue Arthur to prevent him from hurting his family. Now assured of Arthur's guilt, Dexter begins to make plans to kill him.

Debra recovers from her wound but Lieutenant LaGuerta removes her from the case because of Debra's personal involvement. Still obsessed with solving Lundy's murder, Debra notices that the angle of her wound indicates that the shooter cannot be as tall as Trinity is believed to be. Trace evidence determines that Christine is genetically similar to Trinity and is Arthur Mitchell's illegitimate child. She has been following her father around in an effort to try to clean up after his killings, and so took it on herself to shoot Lundy and Debra when they got too close to Trinity's next target. After Arthur rejects her, Christine kills herself after confessing to the crime in front of Debra. With information collected from Christine, the police start to narrow down the list of possible suspects for Trinity, and Dexter realizes he needs to move fast to get him before the police do.

Dexter follows Arthur around but is surprised when he abducts a young boy from a family at an arcade. Dexter goes back to find that Lundy has missed this part of Arthur's pattern: each Trinity series was preceded, five days before, by the abduction of a ten-year-old boy – and since the bodies were never found, they were not recorded as killings. With the help of Arthur's son Jonah, Dexter tracks down a bomb shelter at a vacant home where Arthur had stowed the child, and is able to stop Arthur from drowning the boy in cement at a nearby Four Walls One Heart construction site. But Arthur gets away. Dexter, as "Kyle", blackmails Arthur with the threat of exposing him as a pedophile, as a way to meet Arthur in secret. Instead, Arthur tries to find and kill "Kyle", in the process killing an innocent with the same name. Arthur then tricks Dexter to reveal himself, follows him back to the police station where they confront each other and he learns Dexter's true identity.

Thus revealed, Dexter tails Arthur to a bank parking lot. He drugs him and prepares to take him elsewhere but, having sideswiped another car during the pursuit, he is confronted and taken to jail. Dexter is shortly released, but finds that Arthur has disappeared. Dexter arranges a getaway for Rita and his children to the Florida Keys as a means to protect them from Arthur, promising to meet them later in the day. Dexter eventually finds Arthur, chokes him until he faints, and takes him to the same bomb shelter to kill him. After disposing of the evidence, Dexter returns home, and finds a voice mail from Rita. He proceeds to call her back, but is surprised to hear her phone ringing in the house. Hearing baby Harrison's cries, he races to the bathroom to find Arthur's last victim, Rita, dead in the bathtub, and Harrison bawling in the pool of blood on the floor.

Cast

Main
Michael C. Hall as Dexter Morgan
Julie Benz as Rita Morgan
Jennifer Carpenter as Debra Morgan
Desmond Harrington as Joey Quinn
C.S. Lee as Vince Masuka
Lauren Vélez as María LaGuerta
David Zayas as Angel Batista
James Remar as Harry Morgan

Special guest star
John Lithgow as Arthur Mitchell

Recurring
Preston Bailey as Cody Bennett
Courtney Ford as Christine Hill
Christina Robinson as Astor Bennett
Brando Eaton as Jonah Mitchell
Rick Peters as Elliot
Julia Campbell as Sally Mitchell
Vanessa Marano as Becca Mitchell
David Ramsey as Anton Briggs
Keith Carradine as Frank Lundy
Geoff Pierson as Tom Matthews
Alicia Lagano as Nikki Wald
Tasia Sherel as Francis

Guest
Mary Mara as Valerie Hodges 
Jake Short as Scott Smith 
Gino Aquino as Benito Gomez
Christina Cox as Zoey Kruger 
Greg Ellis as John Farrow
Ian Patrick Williams as Stan Beaudry 
Adrienne Barbeau as Suzanna Coffey
Suzanne Cryer as Tarla Grant

Crew
Third season executive producers John Goldwyn, Sara Colleton, Clyde Phillips and Charles H. Eglee all returned to their roles. Third season co-executive producers Scott Buck, Melissa Rosenberg and Michael C. Hall were all promoted to executive producers for the fourth season. Third season producer Timothy Schlattmann was promoted to supervising producer for the fourth season. Wendy West also joined the crew as a supervising producer and writer. Third season co-producer Lauren Gussis was promoted to producer. Robert Lloyd Lewis remained the on set producer. 
Gary Law remained a co-producer. Associate producer Chad Tomasoski returned and was promoted to co-producer mid-season.

Episodes

Critical attention
The New Yorkers Emily Nussbaum called Lithgow's characterization of Arthur as "so creepy I’m still not over it" in 2011 and also said the character was "modelled on the BTK Killer".

In the 2016 book titled TV (The Book), co-written by critics Alan Sepinwall and Matt Zoller Seitz, Sepinwall included the fourth season of Dexter in the section "A Certain Regard", which consisted of shows they loved but were not able to reach their list of the 100 greatest American television series. Sepinwall praised the season as the entire series' best, stating that "[s]tructurally, the Trinity season was a rehash of the first, but Lithgow was mesmerizing as a kindly old man who was cruel underneath. And the climax... was such a perfect ending not only to that season, but to Dexter as a whole, that continuing the series felt redundant."

References

External links
 
 

Dexter (TV series) episodes
2009 American television seasons